Parornix preciosella is a moth of the family Gracillariidae. It is known from Québec, Canada, and Connecticut, Pennsylvania and Vermont in the United States.

The larvae feed on Vaccinium corymbosum and Prunus virginiana. They mine the leaves of their host plant.

References

Parornix
Moths of North America
Moths described in 1907